US Naval Ordnance Testing Facility Control Tower is a historic building located at Topsail Island, Pender County, North Carolina. It was built in 1946 by Kellex Corporation, and is a reinforced concrete frame measuring 16 feet by 16 feet and 30 feet high. The building was purchased for civilian purposes in 1957 and a flat roof replaced a formerly open platform on the top level. It was erected to serve as commend headquarters for "Operation Bumblebee."

It was listed on the National Register of Historic Places in 1993.

References

Military facilities on the National Register of Historic Places in North Carolina
Buildings and structures completed in 1946
Buildings and structures in Pender County, North Carolina
National Register of Historic Places in Pender County, North Carolina